Johan Arne Olsson (born 19 March 1980) is a Swedish cross-country skiing coach and former skier. He is a two-time Olympic champion who raced from 1998 to 2017. Olsson won five individual FIS Cross-Country World Cup victories and two additional podium finishes during his career.

Athletic career
Olsson became an Olympian in 2006 when he was selected to represent Sweden in the 2006 Winter Olympics in Turin. He earned a bronze medal in the 4 × 10 km relay and finished 6th in the 15 km event. At the 2010 Winter Olympics in Vancouver, Olsson earned a bronze medal in the 30 km pursuit after leading most of the race, and together with the Swedish team he won the gold medal on the 4 × 10 km relay after a deciding performance on the 2nd stage. During the same Olympic Games Olsson won another bronze medal in the 50 km event.

In the FIS Nordic World Ski Championships 2013 in Val di Fiemme, Olsson won the prestigious 50 km classical race. He pulled ahead of the pack after 20 km and never let go of his lead. It was an impressive solo performance to win Sweden's first gold medal on the 50 km in a big competition in over 20 years. Olsson also won silver on the 15 km freestyle, finishing 9 seconds behind Petter Northug.

At the 2014 Winter Olympics Olsson won a silver medal at the 15 km classical.

Olsson retired from skiing before the 2015–2016 season, but announced a comeback in April 2016 for the FIS Nordic World Ski Championships in Lahti. Olsson retired from professional skiing in April 2017.

On 12 April 2017, his second retirement from cross-country skiing was announced.

Coaching career
In May 2018, it was announced that Olsson would become a coach for Team Sweden men's cross-country skiing, for the 2018–2019 season, together with Mattias Nilsson and Fredrik Uusitalo.

Cross-country skiing results
All results are sourced from the International Ski Federation (FIS).

Olympic Games
 6 medals – (2 gold, 1 silver, 3 bronze)

World Championships
 8 medals – (2 gold, 4 silver, 2 bronze)

World Cup

Season standings

Individual podiums
 5 victories – (5 ) 
 7 podiums – (7 )

Team podiums
 1 victory – (1 ) 
 9 podiums – (9 )

Personal life
Olsson married his former teammate Anna Olsson (née Dahlberg) in 2008. Together they have two daughters, named Molly and Signe.

References

External links

 
 
 

1980 births
Swedish male cross-country skiers
Tour de Ski skiers
Cross-country skiers at the 2006 Winter Olympics
Cross-country skiers at the 2010 Winter Olympics
Cross-country skiers at the 2014 Winter Olympics
Olympic cross-country skiers of Sweden
Medalists at the 2006 Winter Olympics
Medalists at the 2010 Winter Olympics
Medalists at the 2014 Winter Olympics
Olympic medalists in cross-country skiing
Olympic gold medalists for Sweden
Olympic silver medalists for Sweden
Olympic bronze medalists for Sweden
FIS Nordic World Ski Championships medalists in cross-country skiing
Cross-country skiers from Västmanland County
People from Västerås Municipality
Living people
Åsarna IK skiers